The TihRăstolița in Romania. Its source is in the Călimani Mountains.

References

Rivers of Romania
Rivers of Mureș County